Patriot Bank, N.A. (PNBK) is the bank holding company for Stamford, Connecticut-based  Patriot Bank NA, which has locations in Connecticut and New York State. Patriot Bank provides retail and commercial banking services to local businesses, nonprofits, municipalities, families, and individuals throughout southern Connecticut and Westchester County, New York. The company is traded on NASDAQ as PNBK.

The bank operates seven locations in Fairfield County, Connecticut, one in New Haven County, Connecticut, and one in Westchester County, New York.

History
On August 31, 1994, Patriot National Bank obtained its charter and opened for business as a community bank. In 1999, Patriot National Bancorp, Inc. was organized as a Bank Holding Company headquartered in Stamford, Connecticut.

As the bank continued its evolution, Patriot National Statutory Trust I was founded On March 11, 2003, to issue trust preferred securities and invest the proceeds in subordinated debentures issued by the company.

Patriot National Bank expanded its geographical footprint in 2006, when it purchased a branch office and opened two new branch offices in New York, helping it to expand into New York State.

On February 26, 2013, the company announced the appointment of Kenneth T. Neilson as president and CEO owing to the resignation of Christopher Maher, the former president and CEO of the company.

Under Neilson's leadership, the bank reshaped its community focus, presence and commitment to provide commercial and consumer banking services in the areas it serves. As part of that effort, Patriot announced its new name “Patriot Bank” on September 28, 2015.

On August 25, 2016, Patriot National Bancorp named bank chairman Michael Carrazza to assume the additional role as interim CEO.

In January 2017, Patriot Bank named Richard Muskus, Jr. as president, promoting him from within. Mr. Muskus has served as executive vice president and chief lending officer of Patriot since February 2014. On July 24, 2017, Mr. Muskus was appointed to the company's board of directors.

The restructured leadership team developed and implemented strategic initiatives focused on improving operational efficiencies, product diversification, and asset growth, which has continuously led to improved performance and strong earnings growth.

On March 30, 2017, Patriot announced a $2.8 million loan recovery.

On July 17, 2017, Patriot announced its first quarterly dividend for shareholders for the first time since 2008.

On August 2, 2017, Patriot announced the signing of a definitive merger agreement pursuant to which Patriot will acquire Prime Bank in Orange, CT, expanding its community banking presence in Connecticut.

On July 7, 2020, Robert G. Russell, Jr. was appointed as president and chief executive officer of Patriot National Bancorp, Inc. (the “Company”) and Patriot Bank, N.A. (“Patriot Bank”), a wholly owned subsidiary of the Company.

Prior to joining the Company and Patriot Bank, Mr. Russell (age 54) served as executive vice president and chief operating officer of Millington Bank of Morris and Somerset Counties of New Jersey. Mr. Russell has more than 30 years of community banking experience. Previously, he served as president and chief executive officer of NJM Bank, and before that, as its chief financial and investment officer. Mr. Russell has led both institutions to achieve significant growth and increases in profitability. 

On 21 July 2020, Patriot National Bancorp, Inc., Patriot Bank's parent company, confirmed it has completed a deal to purchase prepaid debit card deposits from a popular regional lender and prepaid debit card processor for business, retailer, and government customers. Balances associated with this transaction are projected to reach about $52 million in the coming week and rise over time from that initial point.

Branches 
Patriot Bank is a leading community and commercial bank headquartered in Stamford, CT with branches in Fairfield and New Haven Counties in Connecticut and in Westchester County in New York. 
 Darien, Connecticut – 233 Post Rd., Darien, CT 06820
 Fairfield, Connecticut – 1755 Black Rock Turnpike, Fairfield, CT 06825
 Greenwich, Connecticut – 100 Mason Street, Greenwich, CT 06830
 Milford, Connecticut – 771 Boston Post Rd., Milford, CT 06460
Orange, Connecticut - 7 Old Tavern Road, Orange, CT 06477
 Norwalk, Connecticut – 16 River St., Norwalk, CT 06850
 Stamford, Connecticut – 999 Bedford St., Stamford, CT 06901
 Westport, Connecticut – 415 Post Rd. East, Westport, CT 06880
 Scarsdale, New York – 495 Central Park Ave., Scarsdale, NY 10583

Live Banker ATMs 
Patriot Bank launched exciting new ATM conferencing technology in 2016. Put simply, Relationship Bankers will help customers complete almost every transaction or service that otherwise can be done in a branch location via video through an Interactive Teller Machine. Live Banker ATMs are located in the following locations:
 Darien, Connecticut - (Darien Branch) – 233 Post Road, Darien, Connecticut 06820
Fairfield, Connecticut – 1755 Black Rock Turnpike, Fairfield, CT 06825
Greenwich, Connecticut – 100 Mason Street, Greenwich, CT 06830
Milford, Connecticut – 771 Boston Post Rd., Milford, CT 06460
Norwalk, Connecticut – 16 River St., Norwalk, CT 06850
Scarsdale, New York – 495 Central Park Ave., Scarsdale, NY 10583
Stamford, Connecticut - (Stamford Branch) – 999 Bedford Street, Stamford, Connecticut 06895
Stamford, Connecticut - (Corporate Office) - 900 Bedford Street, Stamford, Connecticut 06901
 Westport, Connecticut - (Westport Branch) - 415 Post Road East, Westport, CT 06880
 Trumbull, Connecticut - (Trumbull Westfield Mall) - 5065 Main St., Trumbull, CT 06611
 Bridgeport, Connecticut - (Housatonic Community College) - 900 Lafayette Blvd, Bridgeport, CT 06604

Community involvement 
As part of its mission to ‘show by doing,’ Patriot Bank, N.A. regularly participates in and supports community-centric events in the areas it serves. This has included events and programs focused on small business, children needs, the homeless, arts and culture, professional development, human services, public and societal benefit and more.

One example is Patriot Bank's funding for the restoration of Norwalk, Connecticut's century-old Wall Street Theater. Listed in the National Register of Historical Places, the former Globe Theater opened in 1915 as a vaudeville theater hosting some of the largest names in American entertainment at the time, including: Mary Pickford, John Barrymore, Lillian and Dorothy Gish, John Philip Sousa and more. The Wall Street Theater is the linchpin of a major inner-city redevelopment in Norwalk's Wall Street Historic District and opened in May 2017.

Recognition 
On September 28, 2015, Patriot National Bancorp, Inc. was named a Sandler O’Neill Small Bank Sm-All-Star by investment and advisory firm Sandler O'Neill and Partners. Patriot was the only bank in New England to earn this distinction among the 435 publicly traded banks and thrifts evaluated.

On January 9, 2012, M&A Advisory named Patriot National Bancorp, Inc. and Solaia Capital Advisors LLC as Finalists for the 6th Annual 2012 Middle Market Turnaround of the Year Award.

In June 2004, Patriot National Bancorp, Inc. was named one of the 25 Best Public Companies in Connecticut by the Hartford Courant newspaper. The ranking was based on profits, growth, shareholders return, revenue increase and change in employment level.

Media 
On August 25, 2015, the company announced Castle Creek Capital joined its circle of institutional investors in PNBK Holdings.

Connecticut-based Norwalk Hour chronicled Patriot Bank's  financing of the $7.5 million Wall Street Theater restoration project on September 25, 2015. Listed in the National Register of Historic Places, the 100-year-old former vaudeville theater is being restored as a next-generation performance space that, in early 2016, will open debt free as a result of Patriot's efforts.

On September 4, 2015, the Fairfield County Business Journal, Westchester County Business Journal and Hearst Connecticut newspapers spotlighted Patriot's growth under President & CEO Kenneth Neilson. In the article,  Neilson discussed the strategy behind the bank's turnaround and local community focus, which has resulted in eight quarters of increased earnings under his leadership.

On September 28, 2015, the Hearst Connecticut newspapers and Greenwich Sentinel reported that Patriot National Bank has dropped its middle name to reflect the company's focus on local banking services.

On October 7, 2015, Patriot Bank celebrated the dedication of a new branch in Darien, CT, which includes a community event center with teleconferencing capabilities and a private bank atmosphere.

On December 9, 2015, the American Banker featured Patriot Bank, N.A.’s leadership and interest in growth through possible small-bank acquisitions. CEO Kenneth Neilson told the magazine, “We’re looking for a good fit to jump-start our growth…It needs to geographically make sense.”

On February 7, 2016, Patriot National Bancorp, Inc. expanded its stock ownership family by granting each of its employees, as of December 31, 2015, 100 shares of stock, ensuring that they have an even greater incentive in the success of the bank and exceeding its customer expectations.

On March 30, 2017, Patriot announced a $2.8 million loan recovery in connection with a previously reported loan loss that arose from a borrower fraud.

On July 17, 2017, Patriot announced its intention to begin making quarterly dividends for shareholders of the community bank's stock, another sign of its continuing strong performance.

On August 2, 2017, Patriot and Prime Bank, headquartered in Orange, CT, jointly announced the signing of a definitive merger agreement pursuant to which Patriot will acquire Prime. The acquisition will expand Patriot's community banking presence and footprint in Southern Connecticut.

References

External links

Banks based in Connecticut
Financial services companies of the United States
Holding companies of the United States
Companies based in Stamford, Connecticut
American companies established in 1999
Banks established in 1999
Holding companies established in 1999
Companies listed on the Nasdaq